Darlington is a surname. Notable people with the surname include:

 Adam de Darlington or Derlingtun, 13th century English churchman based in Scotland
 Annie McCarer Darlington (1836-1907), American poet
 Charles Darlington, (1901–1986) U.S. ambassador to Gabon
 Christy Darlington, (born 1972) American musician
 C. D. Darlington, (1903–1981) English biologist
 Edward Darlington (1795–1884), member of the U.S. House of Representatives from Pennsylvania
 Ian Darlington, (born 1977) English cricketer
 Isaac Darlington (1781–1839), member of the U.S. House of Representatives from Pennsylvania
 James Henry Darlington (1856–1930), first Episcopal bishop of Harrisburg, Pennsylvania
 Jay Darlington, (born 1968) English keyboardist
 Jeff Darlington, (born 1981) American sportswriter
 Jennie Darlington (1924–2017), Canadian explorer
 Jermaine Darlington, (born 1974) English association footballer
 Jonathan Darlington, (born 1956) British conductor
 Joseph Darlington (1765–1851), representative in the Legislature of the Northwest Territory (later Ohio)
 Kevin Darlington, (born 1972) Guyana-born American cricketer
 Mike Darlington (born 1989), CEO of Monstercat
 P. Jackson Darlington Jr. (1904–1983), American entomologist and naturalist
 Ralph Darlington, (born 1960s) Professor of Employment Relations at the University of Salford, England
 R. R. Darlington, British historian
 Sidney Darlington, (1906–1997) American electrical engineer
 Darlington transistor, his invention
 Smedley Darlington (1827–1899), member of the U.S. House of Representatives from Pennsylvania
 Stephen Darlington, (born 1950s) British choral director and conductor
 Tenaya Darlington, (born 1971) American poet
 Ty Darlington (born 1994), American football player
 William Darlington (1782–1863), member of the U.S. House of Representatives from Pennsylvania